Renegades is a 1946 American Western film directed by George Sherman and starring Evelyn Keyes, Willard Parker, Larry Parks and Edgar Buchanan.

Plot
Western of a girl who marries the son of an outlaw, but when he is killed in a fight, she marries the ever loving doctor.

Cast
 Evelyn Keyes as Hannah Brockway 
 Willard Parker as Dr. Sam Martin
 Larry Parks as Ben Dembrow / Ben Taylor
 Edgar Buchanan as Kirk Dembrow
 Jim Bannon as Cash Dembrow
 Forrest Tucker as Frank Dembrow
 Ludwig Donath as Jackorski
 Frank Sully as Link
 Willard Robertson as Nathan Brockway
 Paul E. Burns as Alkali Kid

See also
 List of American films of 1946

References

External links

1946 films
1940s English-language films
American Western (genre) films
1946 Western (genre) films
Films scored by Paul Sawtell
Films directed by George Sherman
1940s American films
Films with screenplays by Francis Edward Faragoh